Casey Desmond is the debut album from rock singer-songwriter and guitarist Casey Desmond. Desmond co-wrote "Did We Make It" with Taylor Barefoot and "Undertow" with Grammy-winner Will Ackerman. The rest of the songs on this album, Desmond wrote herself.

Track listing 
All tracks by Casey Desmond except where noted

"Did We Make It" (Taylor Barefoot, Desmond) – 3:26
"Taste It" – 3:28
"Two Girls" – 2:50
"Shivering" – 4:42
"The Child" – 3:49
"Swim" – 3:34
"Sorry Ain't Enough" – 3:18
"Scenario" – 3:43
"I Was Right" – 3:02
"Stray" – 3:42
"Lay Here" – 2:53
"Meaningless" – 5:43
"Undertow" (William Paul Ackerman, Desmond) – 4:02

Personnel 

 Will Ackerman – Guitar (Acoustic)
 Taylor Barefoot – Guitar (Acoustic), Guitar, Guitar (Electric), Guitar (12 String), Engineer, Mixing
 Patti Barkas – Vocals
 James Caldwell – Drums
 Bryan Carrigan – Mixing
 Mike Denneen – Mixing
 Casey Desmond – Guitar (Acoustic), Arranger, Vocals, Harmony Vocals, Art Direction
 Katherine Desmond – Synthesizer, Keyboards, Producer, Photography
 Chris Fogel – Mixing
 Mike Levesque – Drums
 Tony Levin – Bass
 Michael Oakland – Guitar (Acoustic)
 Tom Polce – Bass, Guitar, Drums, Keyboards, Engineer, Mixing
 Jonathan Wyner – Mastering

2005 debut albums
Casey Desmond albums